Alfred Jeslein was consul of the Orange Free State in Brussels, Belgium in 1874.

History of South Africa
South African diplomats
Year of death missing
Year of birth missing